María Lineth de la Trinidad Saborío Chaverri (born 4 November 1960) is a Costa Rican politician.

Political career 
She won the 2021 Social Christian Unity Party presidential primary. In the 2022 Costa Rican general election, she came in fourth place.

References 

Living people
1960 births
Social Christian Unity Party politicians
21st-century Costa Rican women politicians
21st-century Costa Rican politicians
Vice presidents of Costa Rica
Women vice presidents